The Bank of China (Hong Kong) Bauhinia Bowl Award (中銀香港紫荊盃) is an annual award given by the Hong Kong Schools Sports Federation to member secondary schools of the Hong Kong Island and Kowloon Secondary Schools Regional Committee (HKSSRC). The award was established to encourage participation in inter-school sports competitions organised by the Regional Committee. In the 2018–19 season, 265 secondary schools with over 6,000 teams and 44,000 students participated in the 17 sporting competitions organised by the Regional Committee.

The BOCHK Bauhinia Bowl Award is sponsored by Bank of China (Hong Kong) Limited, previously by Omega. The trophy was previously known as the Omega Rose Bowl which dated back to 1965, but has been known as the BOCHK Bauhinia Bowl since the 2002–03 season.

Type of schools
The BOCHK Bauhinia Bowl Awards are awarded separately to boys' schools, girls' schools, and co-educational schools. They are divided into two sections.

The BOCHK Bauhinia Bowl trophies are awarded to schools achieving the best all-round performance from all sporting events organised by the Regional Committee during the year. A total of 10 trophies will be awarded each year: Champion, Second place, and Most Progressed for girls' and boys' schools, and the same with an extra third-place trophy for co-educational schools.

The BOCHK Bauhinia Bowl Sportsboy/Sportsgirl of the Year statuette trophies are awarded to individuals who have contributed greatly to school sport in general and shown outstanding sporting ability during the year, with consideration given to sporting behaviour, character, and commitment to sport. Trophies are given to the Sportsboy and Sportsgirl of the year from single-sex boys' and girls' schools, and from co-ed schools. Scholarships are awarded by Bank of China (Hong Kong).

In case of doubt in classifying a member school to one of the above categories because of a special situation, the Regional Committee makes the final decision on classification. However, schools concerned are welcomed to express their views to the Regional Committee either by letter or presence at a Committee Meeting for this purpose.

The award 
The award is divided into two sections:

Section One – BOCHK Bauhinia Bowl
Trophies will be awarded to schools achieving the best all-round performance from all sporting events organised by the Regional Committee each year.  A total of 10 trophies will be awarded each year.

The trophies are all follows:-
 BOCHK Bauhinia Bowl (Champion) – Boys Schools
 BOCHK Bauhinia Bowl (Second) – Boys Schools
 BOCHK Bauhinia Bowl The Most Progressive Boys School – Boys Schools
 BOCHK Bauhinia Bowl (Champion) – Girls Schools
 BOCHK Bauhinia Bowl (Second) – Girls Schools
 BOCHK Bauhinia Bowl The Most Progressive Girls School – Girls Schools
 BOCHK Bauhinia Bowl (Champion) – Co-educational Schools
 BOCHK Bauhinia Bowl (Second) – Co-educational Schools
 BOCHK Bauhinia Bowl (Third) – Co-educational Schools
 BOCHK Bauhinia Bowl The Most Progressive Co-educational School – Co-educational Schools

In addition to the above awards, the following trophies will also be awarded commencing 2006 – 2007 season
 BOCHK Bauhinia Bowl (Third) – Boys' Schools
 BOCHK Bauhinia Bowl (Third) – Girls Schools
 BOCHK Bauhinia Bowl (Fourth) – Co-educational Schools
 BOCHK Bauhinia Bowl (Fifth) – Co-educational Schools
 BOCHK Bauhinia Bowl (Sixth) – Co-educational Schools
 BOCHK Bauhinia Bowl (Seventh) – Co-educational Schools 
 BOCHK Bauhinia Bowl (Eighth) – Co-educational Schools

Section Two – BOCHK Bauhinia Bowl Sportsboy/Sportsgirl of the Year
These statuette trophies are awarded to the individual who has contributed greatly to his or her schools' sports in general and has shown outstanding ability in the field of sport during the year. In addition to good all-round achievement in sports, the candidate for the trophy must show a high standard of sportsmanship on and off the field. The candidate must have shown a willingness to help others, some kind of organising capacity, a sense of fair play and must be genuinely interested in furthering the spirit of competition and esprit-de-corps between member schools and Hong Kong Sports in general. Bank of China (Hong Kong) Limited has very generously offered a scholarship to each Sportsboy/Sportsgirl of the Year. The trophies for Sportsboy/Sportsgirl of the Year are as follows:

 Sportsboy of the Year – Boys Schools
 Sportsgirl of the Year – Girls Schools
 Sportsboy of the Year – Co-educational Schools
 Sportsgirl of the Year – Co-educational Schools

Teaming and scoring system
The Teaming and Scoring System is at the official home page of the Hong Kong Schools Sports Federation.

Honour roll

Boys' Schools

Girls' Schools

Co-educational Schools

Sportsboys of the Year (Boys Schools)

Sportsgirls of the Year (Girls Schools)

Sportsboys of the Year (Co-educational Schools)

Sportsgirls of the Year (Co-educational Schools)

Summary statistics

Boys Schools Champion (up till the Season 2019 – 2020)

Girls Schools Champion (up till the Season 2019 – 2020)

Co-educational Schools Champion (up till the Season 2019 – 2020)

Sportsboy of the Year (Boys Schools) (up till the Season 2019 – 2020)

Sportsgirl of the Year (Girls Schools) (up till the Season 2019 – 2020)

Sportsboy of the Year (Co-educational Schools) (up till the Season 2019 – 2020)

Sportsgirl of the Year (Co-educational Schools) (up till the Season 2019 – 2020)

References

Competitions in Hong Kong